Kainji Dam is a dam across the Niger River in Niger State of Central Nigeria. Construction of the dam was carried out by Impregilo (a consortium of Italian Civil Engineering Contractors) to designs by Joint Consultants, Balfour Beatty and Nedeco, and began in 1964 to be completed in 1968. The total cost was estimated at US$209 million (equivalent to about US$ billion in  dollars), with one-quarter of this amount used to resettle people displaced by the construction of the dam and its reservoir, Kainji Lake.

Dimensions
Most of the structure is made from earth, but the centre section, housing the hydroelectric turbines, was built from concrete. Kanji Dam is one of the longest dams in the world.

Power station
The dam generates electricity for all the large cities in Nigeria. Some of the electricity is sold to the neighbouring country of Niger. In addition, occasional droughts have made the Niger's water flow unpredictable, diminishing the dam's electrical output.

Lock
The dam has a single-lock chamber capable of lifting barges .

Discharge flooding
In October 1998 in response to upstream flooding, a torrent of water was released from the dam, bursting the river banks. Downstream from the dam 60 villages were flooded. Domestic animals drowned and dikes as well as several farms were washed away. Dam officials were criticized for waiting too long before starting, then dumping too much water.

Lake Kainji 
In 1999, uncoordinated opening of floodgates led to local flooding of about 60 villages.

See also

 List of hydropower stations in Africa

References

Dams completed in 1968
Kainji Lake
Dams in Nigeria
Crossings of the Niger River
Niger State
20th-century architecture in Nigeria

zh:卡因吉大壩